Gerard Moreno (born November 14, 1956) is a US Paralympic fencer, who has competed in the 2000, 2004, 2008 and 2012 Paralympics. Currently Gerard is ranked #1 in the United States and #13 world-wide.

Background
Born and raised in Los Angeles Gerard was always active in sports and was first introduced to fencing by acting as a sparring partner for his brother. Then in 1981 Gerrard was shot in the chest during a robbery in his home. He spent the next 6 months in hospital and was paralyzed from his waist down.

Sports
Slowly Gerard got back into sports; first with wheelchair tennis, then off-road wheelchair racing in which he won national titles. In 1996 he began his return to fencing competing in sabre and foil and has since competed on four World Championship Teams and 4 Paralympic Teams (Sydney, Athens, Beijing and London).

Noted Results

National
2012 US National Championships Foil & Saber - Silver Medalist – Virginia Beach, VA 
2011 US National Champion Foil & Saber – Portland, OR
2011 North American Cup Foil – Silver Medalist – Kansas City, MO
2011 North American Cup Saber – Bronze Medalist – Kansas City, MO
2010 US National Championships Foil - Bronze Medalist – Dallas, TX
2010 US National Championships Saber - Silver Medalist – Dallas, TX
2010 North American Cup Foil – Bronze Medalist – Cincinnati, OH
2009 US National Champion Foil – Dallas, TX
2009 US National Championships Saber - Silver Medalist – Dallas, TX
2007 US National Championships Foil & Saber - Silver Medalist – Miami, FL
2006 US National Champion Foil & Saber – Reno, NV
2005 US National Championships Saber – Sacramento, CA
2005 US National Championships Foil - Silver Medalist – Sacramento, CA
2005 North American Cup – Foil – Bronze Medalist – Chattanooga, TN
2005 North American Cup – Saber – Silver Medalist – Chattanooga, TN
2004 North American Cup Foil - Bronze Medalist – Atlanta, GA
2004 North American Cup Saber - Silver Medalist – Charlotte, NC
2003 North American Cup – Gold Medalist – Palm Springs, CA
2003 US National Championships - Saber - Silver Medalist – Austin, TX
2002 US National Champion Saber – Orlando, FL
2002 US National Championships Foil - Silver Medalist – Orlando, FL
2001 US National Champion Saber – Sandy, UT
2001 North American Cup Foil - Bronze Medalist – Louisville, KY
2001 North American Cup Saber - Gold Medalist – Palm Springs, CA
2000 US National Championships Foil Bronze Medalist – Austin, TX
2000 US National Championships Saber - Silver Medalist – Austin, TX
1999 North American Cup Saber – Silver Medalist – Cleveland, OH
1999 North American Cup Foil – Bronze Medalist – Cleveland, OH
1999 North American Cup Foil & Épée - Bronze Medalist – Palm Springs, CA

International
2011 Pan American Zonal Championships Foil – Gold Medalist – São Paulo, Brazil 
2011 Pan American Zonal Championships Team Foil – Silver Medalist – São Paulo, Brazil
2011 World Championships Saber – 16th place – Catania, Italy
2011 World Championships Foil – 20th place – Catania, Italy
2009 World Cup Foil – Bronze Medalist – Montreal, Canada 
2008 Paralympic Games Saber – 16th place – Beijing, China
2008 Paralympic Games Foil – 15th place – Beijing, China
2007 World Cup Foil Team – Bronze Medalist – Montreal, Canada
2006 World Championships Saber – 16th place – Torino, Italy
2006 World Championships Foil – 11th place – Torino, Italy
2006 World Cup Saber – Bronze Medalist, Montreal, Canada
2005 World Cup Saber – 9th place – Paris, France
2005 World Cup Foil – 10th place – Paris France
2004 Paralympic Games Foil – 10th place – Athens, Greece
2004 Paralympic Games Saber – 17th – Athens, Greece
2003 World Cup Saber – Bronze Medalist - Seville, Spain
2003 World Cup Saber – Bronze Medalist - Atlanta, GA
2002 Pan American Zonal Championships Saber – Gold Medalist – Austin, TX
2002 World Cup Foil – Bronze Medalist – Austin, TX
2002 World Championships Saber – 10th place – Budapest, Hungary
2002 World Cup Saber – Bronze Medalist – Warsaw, Poland
2000 Paralympic Games Saber – 11th place – Sydney, Australia
2000 Paralympic Games Foil – 16th place – Sydney, Australia
2000 Paralympic Games Team Saber – 8th place – Sydney, Australia
2000 World Cup Foil – 9th place – Lonato, Italy
2000 World Cup Saber – 9th place – Lonato, Italy
1999 World Cup Foil – 9th place – Budapest, Hungary
1999 World Cup Saber – 13th place – Budapest, Hungary
1999 World Cup Foil – 11th place – Oviedo, Spain
1999 World Cup Saber – 8th place – Oviedo, Spain
1999 World Cup Foil – Bronze Medalist – Montreal, Canada
1999 World Cup Saber – Silver Medalist – Montreal, Canada
1998 World Championships Foil – 21st place – Euskirchen, Germany
1998 World Championships Saber – 12th place – Euskirchen, Germany

References

External links
Gerard Moreno

1956 births
Living people
Sportspeople from Los Angeles
American male épée fencers
American male foil fencers
American male sabre fencers